Stigmella montanotropica is a moth of the family Nepticulidae. It is found in tropical montane forest on the western slopes on the Andes in Ecuador.

The wingspan is 5-5.1 mm for females. Adults have been found from February to early March.

The larvae feed on Acalypha species. They mine the leaves of their host plant. The mine consists of a very long, slender, sinuous to contorted gallery mostly located on the upper side of the leaf. In the first half, the dark brown or blackish frass can fill the entire width of the gallery. Later, the frass is deposited in arcuate (curved) waves with or without leaving narrow clear margins. The final stage of the mine is the longest. Here, the frass is deposited in a broad trace of black granulated frass.

External links
New Neotropical Nepticulidae (Lepidoptera) from the western Amazonian rainforest and the Andes of Ecuador

Nepticulidae
Moths of South America
Moths described in 2002